KROX may refer to:

 KROX (AM), a radio station (1260 AM) licensed to Crookston, Minnesota, United States
 KROX-FM, a radio station (101.5 FM) licensed to Buda, Texas, United States